Phaeton Airport is an airport located in Phaeton, a town in the Fort-Liberte area of the Nord-Est Department of Haiti.

See also
Transport in Haiti
List of airports in Haiti

References

External links
OpenStreetMap - Phaeton

Airports in Haiti
Nord-Est (department)